Swami Vivekananda University is a private university in Barrackpore, North 24 Parganas district, West Bengal.

See also

References

External links
swamivivekanandauniversity.ac.in
University Grants Commission
National Assessment and Accreditation Council

Universities and colleges in North 24 Parganas district
Universities and colleges in West Bengal
Educational institutions established in 2020
2020 establishments in West Bengal